Aidan Coyne (born 16 November 2003), is an Australian professional footballer who plays as a defender for Watford. He made his professional debut for Perth Glory in a FFA Cup playoff match against Melbourne Victory on 24 November 2021.

Personal life
Coyne is the son of former Socceroo Chris and the grandson of former Socceroo John. His uncle Jamie is also a former soccer player. Aidan Coyne was born in England while his father was playing for Luton Town.

References

External links

Living people
Australian soccer players
Association football defenders
Perth RedStar FC players
Perth Glory FC players
Watford F.C. players
National Premier Leagues players
2003 births